The year 1706 in architecture involved some significant events.

Buildings and structures

Buildings

 The dome of Les Invalides in Paris, France is completed.
 Ljubljana Cathedral, largely designed by Andrea Pozzo, is completed.
 Dominican Church and Convent of Assumption of Mary in Tarnobrzeg, Poland, is rebuilt.
 Church of St George the Martyr, Holborn, London, designed by Arthur Tooley, is completed.
 Yeni-Kale Ottoman Turkish fortress in the Crimea is completed under the guidance of Goloppo.

Births
 March 4 – Lauritz de Thurah, Danish architect (died 1759)
 August 28 – Jan Bouman, Dutch architect working in Potsdam (died 1776)
 Mateus Vicente de Oliveira, Portuguese architect (died 1786)
 Thomas Gilbert, English architect (died 1776)

Deaths
 October? – Martin Grünberg, Prussian architect (born c.1655)
 Approximate date – Tylman van Gameren, Dutch architect working in Warsaw (born 1632)

References 

architecture
Years in architecture
18th-century architecture